The Latvian Civil Aviation Agency (CAA) is the civil aviation authority of Latvia. Its head office is in Riga Airport in Mārupe municipality, near the capital, Riga.

It is subordinate to the Aviation Department of the Ministry of Transport.

Under Order No. 22, the Latvia Civil Aviation Administration was established on 1 October 1993. On 1 January 2006 the agency was reformed into the current Civil Aviation Agency.

References

External links

Latvian Civil Aviation Agency
Latvian Civil Aviation Agency 

Aviation in Latvia
Government of Latvia
1993 establishments in Latvia